Adenosine (symbol A) is an organic compound that occurs widely in nature in the form of diverse derivatives. The molecule consists of an adenine attached to a ribose via a β-N9-glycosidic bond. Adenosine is one of the four nucleoside building blocks of RNA (and its derivative deoxyadenosine is a building block of DNA), which are essential for all life. Its derivatives include the energy carriers adenosine mono-, di-, and triphosphate, also known as AMP/ADP/ATP. Cyclic adenosine monophosphate (cAMP) is pervasive in signal transduction. Adenosine is used as an intravenous medication for some cardiac arrhythmias.

Adenosyl (abbreviated Ado or 5'-dAdo) is the chemical group formed by removal of the 5′-hydroxy (OH) group. It is found in adenosylcobalamin (an active form of vitamin B12) and as a radical in radical SAM enzymes.

Medical uses

Supraventricular tachycardia 
In individuals with supraventricular tachycardia (SVT), adenosine is used to help identify and convert the rhythm.

Certain SVTs can be successfully terminated with adenosine. This includes any re-entrant arrhythmias that require the AV node for the re-entry, e.g., AV reentrant tachycardia (AVRT) and AV nodal reentrant tachycardia (AVNRT). In addition, atrial tachycardia can sometimes be terminated with adenosine.

Fast rhythms of the heart that are confined to the atria (e.g., atrial fibrillation and atrial flutter) or ventricles (e.g., monomorphic ventricular tachycardia), and do not involve the AV node as part of the re-entrant circuit, are not typically converted by adenosine. However, the ventricular response rate is temporarily slowed with adenosine in such cases.

Because of the effects of adenosine on AV node-dependent SVTs, adenosine is considered a class V antiarrhythmic agent. When adenosine is used to cardiovert an abnormal rhythm, it is normal for the heart to enter ventricular asystole for a few seconds. This can be disconcerting to a normally conscious patient, and is associated with angina-like sensations in the chest.

Nuclear stress test 
Adenosine is used as an adjunct to thallium (TI 201) or technetium (Tc99m) myocardial perfusion scintigraphy (nuclear stress test) in patients unable to undergo adequate stress testing with exercise.

Dosage 
When given for the evaluation or treatment of a supraventricular tachycardia (SVT), the initial dose is 6 mg to 12 mg, depending on standing orders or provider preference, given as a rapid parenteral infusion. Due to adenosine's extremely short half-life, the IV line is started as proximal (near) to the heart as possible, such as the antecubital fossa. The IV push is often followed with a flush of 10–20 mL of normal saline. If this has no effect (i.e., no evidence of transient AV block), a dose of 12 mg can be given 1–2 minutes after the first dose. When given to dilate the arteries, such as in a "stress test", the dosage is typically 0.14 mg/kg/min, administered for 4 or 6 minutes, depending on the protocol.

The recommended dose may be increased in patients on theophylline since methylxanthines prevent binding of adenosine at receptor sites. The dose is often decreased in patients on dipyridamole (Persantine) and diazepam (Valium) because adenosine potentiates the effects of these drugs. The recommended dose is also reduced by half in patients presenting congestive heart failure, myocardial infarction, shock, hypoxia, and/or chronic liver disease or chronic kidney disease, and in elderly patients.

Drug interactions 
Dipyridamole potentiates the action of adenosine, requiring the use of lower doses.

Methylxanthines (e.g. caffeine found in coffee, theophylline found in tea, or theobromine found in chocolate) have a purine structure and bind to some of the same receptors as adenosine. Methylxanthines act as competitive antagonists of adenosine and can blunt its pharmacological effects. Individuals taking large quantities of methylxanthines may require increased doses of adenosine.

Caffeine acts by blocking binding of adenosine to the adenosine A1 receptor, which enhances release of the neurotransmitter acetylcholine. Caffeine also increases cyclic AMP levels through nonselective inhibition of phosphodiesterase. "Caffeine has a three-dimensional structure similar to that of adenosine," which allows it to bind and block its receptors.

Contraindications 
Common contraindications for adenosine include
 Asthma, traditionally considered an absolute contraindication. This is being contended and it is now considered a relative contraindication (however, selective adenosine antagonists are being investigated for use in treatment of asthma)

Pharmacological effects 
Adenosine is an endogenous purine nucleoside that modulates many physiological processes. Cellular signaling by adenosine occurs through four known adenosine receptor subtypes (A1, A2A, A2B, and A3).

Extracellular adenosine concentrations from normal cells are approximately 300 nM; however, in response to cellular damage (e.g., in inflammatory or ischemic tissue), these concentrations are quickly elevated (600–1,200 nM). Thus, in regard to stress or injury, the function of adenosine is primarily that of cytoprotection preventing tissue damage during instances of hypoxia, ischemia, and seizure activity. Activation of A2A receptors produces a constellation of responses that in general can be classified as anti-inflammatory. Enzymatic production of adenosine can be anti-inflammatory or immunosuppressive.

Adenosine receptors 

All adenosine receptor subtypes (A1, A2A, A2B, and A3) are G-protein-coupled receptors. The four receptor subtypes are further classified based on their ability to either stimulate or inhibit adenylate cyclase activity. The A1 receptors couple to Gi/o and decreases cAMP levels, while the A2 adenosine receptors couple to Gs, which stimulates adenylate cyclase activity. In addition, A1 receptors couple to Go, which has been reported to mediate adenosine inhibition of Ca2+ conductance, whereas A2B and A3 receptors also couple to Gq and stimulate phospholipase activity.
Researchers at Cornell University have recently shown adenosine receptors to be key in opening the blood-brain barrier (BBB).
Mice dosed with adenosine have shown increased transport across the BBB of amyloid plaque antibodies and prodrugs associated with Parkinson's disease, Alzheimer's, multiple sclerosis, and cancers of the central nervous system.

Ghrelin/growth hormone secretagogue receptor 
Adenosine is an endogenous agonist of the ghrelin/growth hormone secretagogue receptor. However, while it is able to increase appetite, unlike other agonists of this receptor, adenosine is unable to induce the secretion of growth hormone and increase its plasma levels.

Mechanism of action 
When it is administered intravenously, adenosine causes transient heart block in the atrioventricular (AV) node. This is mediated via the A1 receptor, inhibiting adenylyl cyclase, reducing cAMP and so causing cell hyperpolarization by increasing K+ efflux via inward rectifier K+ channels, subsequently inhibiting Ca2+ current. It also causes endothelial-dependent relaxation of smooth muscle as is found inside the artery walls. This causes dilation of the "normal" segments of arteries, i.e. where the endothelium is not separated from the tunica media by atherosclerotic plaque. This feature allows physicians to use adenosine to test for blockages in the coronary arteries, by exaggerating the difference between the normal and abnormal segments.

The administration of adenosine also reduces blood flow to coronary arteries past the occlusion. Other coronary arteries dilate when adenosine is administered while the segment past the occlusion is already maximally dilated, which is a process called coronary steal. This leads to less blood reaching the ischemic tissue, which in turn produces the characteristic chest pain.

Metabolism 
Adenosine used as a second messenger can be the result of de novo purine biosynthesis via adenosine monophosphate (AMP), though it is possible other pathways exist.

When adenosine enters the circulation, it is broken down by adenosine deaminase, which is present in red blood cells and the vessel wall.

Dipyridamole, an inhibitor of adenosine nucleoside transporter, allows adenosine to accumulate in the blood stream. This causes an increase in coronary vasodilatation.

Adenosine deaminase deficiency is a known cause of immunodeficiency.

Research

Viruses 

The adenosine analog NITD008 has been reported to directly inhibit the recombinant RNA-dependent RNA polymerase of the dengue virus by terminating its RNA chain synthesis. This interaction suppresses peak viremia and rise in cytokines and prevents lethality in infected animals, raising the possibility of a new treatment for this flavivirus. The 7-deaza-adenosine analog has been shown to inhibit the replication of the hepatitis C virus. BCX4430 is protective against Ebola and Marburg viruses. Such adenosine analogs are potentially clinically useful since they can be taken orally.

Anti-inflammatory properties 
Adenosine is believed to be an anti-inflammatory agent at the A2A receptor. Topical treatment of adenosine to foot wounds in diabetes mellitus has been shown in lab animals to drastically increase tissue repair and reconstruction. Topical administration of adenosine for use in wound-healing deficiencies and diabetes mellitus in humans is currently under clinical investigation.

Methotrexate's anti-inflammatory effect may be due to its stimulation of adenosine release.

Central nervous system 
In general, adenosine has an inhibitory effect in the central nervous system (CNS).
Caffeine's stimulatory effects are credited primarily (although not entirely) to its capacity to block adenosine receptors, thereby reducing the inhibitory tonus of adenosine in the CNS. This reduction in adenosine activity leads to increased activity of the neurotransmitters dopamine and glutamate. Experimental evidence suggests that adenosine and adenosine agonists can activate Trk receptor phosphorylation through a mechanism that requires the adenosine A2A receptor.

Hair 
Adenosine has been shown to promote thickening of hair on people with thinning hair.  A 2013 study compared topical adenosine with minoxidil in male androgenetic alopecia, finding it was as potent as minoxidil (in overall treatment outcomes) but with higher satisfaction rate with patients due to “faster prevention of hair loss and appearance of the newly grown hairs” (further trials were called for to clarify the findings).

Sleep 
The principal component of cannabis delta-9-tetrahydrocannabinol (THC) and the endocannabinoid anandamide (AEA) induce sleep in rats by increasing adenosine levels in the basal forebrain. They also significantly increase slow-wave sleep during the third hour, mediated by CB1 receptor activation. These findings identify a potential therapeutic use of cannabinoids to induce sleep in conditions where sleep may be severely attenuated.

Vasodilation 
It also plays a role in regulation of blood flow to various organs through vasodilation.

See also 
 Adenosine receptor
 Adenosine reuptake inhibitor
 List of growth hormone secretagogues

References 

Adenosine receptor agonists
Antiarrhythmic agents
Chemical substances for emergency medicine
Drugs acting on the cardiovascular system
Ghrelin receptor agonists
Nucleosides
Purines
Vasodilators
Hydroxymethyl compounds